Pointe de Tierce is a mountain in Savoie, France which lies in the Graian Alps range. It has an elevation of 2,973 metres above sea level.

References

Mountains of the Alps
Mountains of Savoie